William "Billy" Ball (1795–1852), the "Shropshire Giant", was a nineteenth-century iron puddler and "giant".

He was born in June 1795 at Horsehay, Great Dawley, Shropshire where he would live for his whole life. His exact date of birth is unrecorded, but he was baptised on 8 July. He was the first son of five children born to Thomas and Elizabeth Ball of Horsehay.

It was said that his "waistcoat was so big that three men could be buttoned into it".

In September 1819, aged 24, he married Mary Bailey. They had two children, Eliza (1823–1824) and Thomas (1824–1839). In 1824, both his wife and daughter died. Thomas also died young, at fifteen. Next year, 1825, he married Margaret Wood (1790-c.1850), who bore him no children.

He was known locally as a cheerful man with a very pleasing disposition.

Ironworker 
From the age of eight he was employed in the Coalbrookdale Company's Horsehay Ironworks, where he continued for forty years (to 1843). He worked mostly as a puddler and later as a shingler.

Puddling is a skilled and extremely strenuous job, requiring great physical strength. In the 1841 census he gave his occupation as a forgeman.

In 1843 he was accidentally blinded in one eye when it was struck by a piece of molten iron. After this he always wore a pair of glass goggles. He also ceased working in the ironworks.

John Bull 
After he left the ironworks he exhibited himself around county fairs as "The Largest Man in Britain", appearing under the pseudonym 'John Bull'.

1850 saw the birth of Alfred Darby II, a descendant of the Darby family, which was to be celebrated by a procession. He was chosen to lead this procession on horseback, along with 'Little Bennie Poole', the smallest man working at the Coalbrookdale Company, riding a pony. Because of his size, he had to be hoisted onto his horse with a block and tackle, with a cry of, "Dunno yo drop me!". Afterwards the horse was so injured that it had to be destroyed.

In the 1851 census of 30 April, he is listed but without specifying an occupation.

The Great Exhibition 
He was invited, as both a guest and a celebrity exhibit, to The Great Exhibition of 1851 in London. As no passenger seat on the train to London was big enough for him, he travelled in the guard's van. This was to be his last major public appearance.

Some Birmingham businessmen were said to have teased him about his size: they asked him how much material would be needed and what the cost would be to make him a suit, but after he quipped that if they would take him to a tailor, have him measured and pay for a suit, he would give them the information they wanted, they didn't bother him anymore.

He did not enjoy his experience of London and was the target of thieves. He left wishing never to return and had no wish to travel from Horsehay again.

Death 
He died the year after his appearance at The Great Exhibition, in June 1852, aged 57.

On his death, he had to be taken from his home in Sandy Bank Row, Horsehay by removing a window and the surrounding brickwork. It took ten strong men to carry the coffin, with straps and poles. It was said to be so large that "ten lads were able to lie in it". Although the funeral at St Luke's Church in Doseley was attended by a large crowd, he was buried in an unmarked grave.

See also 
 Daniel Lambert (1770–1809)

Notes

References 

1795 births
1852 deaths
Engineers from Shropshire
People of the Industrial Revolution